Pietro Marsetti (born 22 February 1965) is a former footballer for L.D.U. Quito (1987–1997) and for the Ecuador national football team (1987–1989) where he scored 3 goals in 25 appearances.

Career
Marsetti began playing youth football with Universidad Católica before signing a professional contract with L.D.U. Quito in 1987. He would play for clubs on both sides of the Quito derby: ten seasons with LDU Quito and four seasons with Sociedad Deportivo Quito.

References

External links
 Pietro Marsetti at BDFA.com.ar 

1964 births
Living people
Ecuadorian footballers
Ecuador international footballers
1987 Copa América players
1989 Copa América players
C.D. Universidad Católica del Ecuador footballers
L.D.U. Quito footballers
C.D. El Nacional footballers
S.D. Quito footballers
Delfín S.C. footballers
Association football midfielders